This is a list of Italian Ministers of the Treasury, from 1946 to present.

List of Ministers of the Treasury
 Parties
1946-1994:

Since 1994:

 Governments

References

Treasury